Senator Fountain may refer to:

Albert Jennings Fountain (1838–1896), Texas State Senate
Lawrence H. Fountain (1913–2002), North Carolina State Senate